Mark Shasha (born 1961) is an American artist. He is also an author, illustrator and educator. His subjects are often familiar and are usually inspired by the textures and light found along the New England coast where he lives and works.    
Shasha studied art at Rhode Island School of Design where he received his B.F.A in 1983. His artwork has been seen in museums, galleries and dozens of publications for three decades. His paintings have appeared in more than 50 notable exhibitions from Hollywood, California to the Lyman Allyn Art Museum in Connecticut and the Society of Illustrators in New York City.

Children's books 
Mark Shasha began his career in art as a writer and illustrator with The Boston Phoenix, the Boston Globe and several other publications. His first book, the children's classic1 Night of the Moonjellies (Simon & Schuster, 1992) was inspired by childhood memories of working at his family's hot dog stand by the sea in New London, Connecticut in the early 1970s.

The story features a warm relationship between a boy and his grandmother along with a variety of characters busy with the hustle and bustle of the fast food business. It also features a bioluminescent jelly-like creature found in the North Atlantic called a moonjelly or Ctenophore (pronounced 'tee ne for').

Another book by Shasha, The Hall of Beasts (Simon & Schuster, 1994), an unusual story about a mysterious mural in an abandoned inn by the sea, did not fare quite as well commercially.

Early influences
N.C. Wyeth, Chris Van Allsburg, Edward Hopper, Winslow Homer and John Singer Sargent

Partial bibliography
 Night of the Moonjellies
 The Hall of Beasts

References 
1Smithsonian Magazine, 1992, Nov. p. 42

2Marblehead Reporter, “Hitting a Home Run - Mark Shasha’s Great Contribution”, June 2, 2005 p. 1

3The Boston Globe, "Mark Shasha's Harbor", June 21, 2005 p. E4 Living/Arts

4Robert's Snow, 2005

 Salem News, "The Pages of Children's Books Fill Marblehead Museum", by Matthew K. Roy, Feb. 2, 2006
 The Boston Globe, "Mark Shasha's Harbor", June 21, 2005 p. E4 Living/Arts
 The New York Times, Vivien Raynor, "Dancing Fairies, Cavorting Pigs: Illustrations for Children’s Books" August 8, 1993, p. 16
 "Something About the Author", Who's Who Encyclopedia of American Authors, volume 83, Mark Shasha, pp. 202–203. Gale Pub.1993
 The New London Day, "A Window to the World – Mark Shasha", August 28, 1992, p. B7*
 Lyman Allyn Museum of Art, Exhibition directory, New London, CT. 1992
 Children's Museum of Southeastern Connecticut, directories, 1998-2008
 Smithsonian Magazine, 1992, Nov. p. 42
 Five in a Row, Vol I, 1994, pp. 30–33
 Literature & Writing Connections : How to Make Books with Children - Grade Level 1 through 6 by Joy Evans, p. 134
 Read This Book Before Your Child Starts School by Miriam W. Lukken, p. 106
 Sesame Street Parent’s Guide, Natural Wonders, by Judith Rovenger, July/August issue, 1993
 The Regional Standard, Salem, CT., “The Book-writing Business”, June 18, 1994, p. 20
 The Hartford Courant, Student’s Get Taste of the Write Stuff, May 2, 1996, p B6
 Marblehead Reporter, “Hitting a Home Run - Mark Shasha’s Great Contribution”, June 2, 2005 p. 1
 The Reporter, “Swampscott Artist Creates Signature Piece for Hospice”, May 26, 2005 A&M p. 3
 North Shore Sunday, “A Sort of Homecoming”, Art Section, May 27, 2005
 Robert’s Snow by Grace Lin, Viking/Penguin Children’s Books, sch.pub.2006
 The Whale Trail Book – 50 Fabulous Whales, Summer 2005, Whale Trail Publishing, K&M Publishing, New London, CT. p. 12
 The Salem News, “Blooming at the Hooper Mansion”, May 13, 2005 p. B2
 Artists of The Rockport Art Association - 85th Anniversary Issue - published by Rockport Art Association Press, 2006
 The Past & Present: Time and Space Cannot Separate Them by Kathleen Valentine and Ted Tysver, Celebrating 85 years of the North Shore Arts Association – North Shore Arts Association of Gloucester, Inc. 2007, pp. 65
 Boston Globe – Arts and Entertainment – Weekend, May 31, 2008 p. 12
 Boston Globe – Arts North – In Local Galleries “Wendy Killeen” - June 1, 2008 – P.3
 Smithsonian Magazine, “Notable Books”, Nov. 2003 Issue
 Boston Globe, People/North, “Mark Shasha at Grosvenor Park”, July 6, 2003 p. 10
 The Regional Standard, Colchester, CT.,“Artist’s Sketches Draw Attention”, Vol. 9. Issue36, May 11, 1996
 The Middletown Press, “The Art of Drawing”, March 6, 1996 p. A3
 Publishers Weekly, Jun 6, 1996, p. 64
 Publishers Weekly, July 20, 1992, p. 249;
 Booklist, Dec 15, 1992 p. 24
 School Library Journal, Dec. 1992, p. 36

Shasha exhibition history in direct reference to the above article

 "Moonjellies and Daydreams - The Art of Mark Shasha" - The Maritime Museum, New London Connecticut, June–August 2012
 The Guild of Boston Artists – “The New England Painters” – 2008
 The Past and the Present -Time and Space Cannot Separate Them – The 85th Anniversary Exhibition of the North Shore Art Association - distinguished artists of the association’s history, Gloucester, MA. 2007
 Robert’s Snow Exhibition (traveling: Hollywood, Chicago, Newburyport, New York) 2005-2006
 Connecticut Fine Arts Academy 94th Annual Invitational Exhibition, Mystic, CT, 2005
 The Art of Children’s Literature - Lyman Allyn Museum – New London, CT, 1993

External links 
 Mark Shasha's homepage
 Rockport Art Association - Shasha Page
 The International Artist Bluebook - Shasha listing
 Guild of Boston Artists - Mark Shasha page

20th-century American painters
American male painters
21st-century American painters
American children's book illustrators
1961 births
Living people
People from Swampscott, Massachusetts
American male writers
Rhode Island School of Design alumni
20th-century American male artists